Charles Chambon was high commissioner of French India. He was born in 1896 and died in 1965. He was in office from 1949 to 1950 and was succeeded by André Ménard.

Titles held

French colonial governors and administrators
1896 births
1965 deaths
Governors of French India

References